Helie Klaasse (born 14 December 1949) is a Dutch rower. She competed in the women's double sculls event at the 1976 Summer Olympics.

References

1949 births
Living people
Dutch female rowers
Olympic rowers of the Netherlands
Rowers at the 1976 Summer Olympics
Rowers from Amsterdam